This is a list of films which placed number one at the weekly box office in the United States during 1978 per Variety. The data was based on grosses from 20 to 22 key cities and therefore, the gross quoted may not be the total that the film grossed nationally in the week.

Number-one films

See also
 List of American films — American films by year
 Lists of box office number-one films

Notes

References

External links
Domestic Box Office Weekends For 1978 (Box Office Mojo)
Theatrical Weekly Box Office Chart Calendar for 1978 (The Numbers)

Chronology

1978
1978 in American cinema
1978-related lists